Bennane Head is a tapering piece of land formed of hard rock projecting into the Firth of Clyde, Scotland, at the northern end of Ballantrae Bay,  southwest of Girvan. A  cave in the cliff under the headland is said to be the place where the cannibal Sawney Bean and his family lived in the 16th century.

References

External links
Video footage of Bennane Cave

Headlands of Scotland
Landforms of South Ayrshire